Anil Hegde is an Indian politician from Janata Dal (United) party, a Member of the Parliament of India representing Bihar in the Rajya Sabha elected from bypoll due to the death of Pharmaceutical Baron and seven time Parliamentarian Mahendra Prasad.

References

Living people
Janata Dal (United) politicians
Members of the Parliament of India
Year of birth missing (living people)
Rajya Sabha members from Bihar